Elections for members of the New York City Council were held on November 7, 2017. Primary elections were held on September 12 for all 51 districts of the city council.

Incumbents not seeking re-election

Term-limited incumbents
Rosie Méndez (D), District 2
Daniel Garodnick (D), District 4
Melissa Mark-Viverito (D), District 8
James Vacca (D), District 13
Annabel Palma (D), District 18
Darlene Mealy (D), District 41
Vincent J. Gentile (D), District 43

Retiring incumbents
Julissa Ferreras (D), District 21
David G. Greenfield (D), District 44

Results

Manhattan

District 1
Democratic primary

General election

District 2
Incumbent Democrat Rosie Mendez was term-limited and could not run for a third term.
Democratic primary

General election

District 3
Incumbent Democrat Corey Johnson was unopposed in the Democratic primary.

General election

District 4
Incumbent Democrat Daniel Garodnick was term-limited and could not seek a third term.
Democratic primary

General election

District 5
Democratic primary

General election

District 6
Democratic primary

General election

District 7
Democratic primary

General election

District 9
Democratic primary

General election

District 10
Democratic primary

General election

Manhattan/Bronx crossover

District 8
Incumbent Democrat and Council Speaker Melissa Mark-Viverito was term-limited and could not seek a 4th term.
Democratic primary

General election

The Bronx

District 11
Incumbent Andrew Cohen was unopposed in the Democratic primary.

General election

District 12
Democratic primary

General election

District 13
Incumbent Democrat James Vacca was term-limited and could not seek a 4th term.
Democratic primary

General election

District 14
Democratic primary

General election

District 15
Incumbent Democrat Ritchie Torres was unopposed in the Democratic primary.

General election

District 16
Incumbent Democrat Vanessa Gibson was unopposed in the Democratic primary.

General election

District 17
Democratic primary

General election

District 18
Incumbent Democrat Annabel Palma was term-limited and could not seek a third term.
Democratic primary

General election

Bronx/Queens crossover

District 22
Incumbent Democrat Costa Constantinides was unopposed in the Democratic primary.

General election

Queens

District 19
Democratic primary

General election

District 20
Democratic primary

General election

District 21
Incumbent Democrat Julissa Ferreras declined to seek a third term.
Democratic primary

General election

District 23
Democratic primary

General election

District 24
Democratic primary

General election

District 25
Incumbent Democrat Daniel Dromm was unopposed in the Democratic primary.

General election

District 26
Incumbent Democrat Jimmy Van Bramer was unopposed in the Democratic primary.

General election

District 27
Democratic primary

General election

District 28
Incumbent Democrat Ruben Wills was expelled from office August 10. The winner of the general election was sworn in early to complete Wills' term.
Democratic primary

General election

District 29
Incumbent Democrat Karen Koslowitz was unopposed in the Democratic primary.

General election

District 30
Democratic primary

General election

Holden, though elected on Republican and generally Republican-affiliated ballot lines, is a registered Democrat and "still consider[s] himself a Democrat"

District 31
Incumbent Democrat Donovan Richards was unopposed in the Democratic primary.

General election

District 32
Democratic primary

General election

Queens/Brooklyn crossover

District 34
Democratic primary

General election

Brooklyn

District 33
Incumbent Democrat Stephen Levin was unopposed in the Democratic primary.

General election

District 35
Democratic primary

Green primary

General election

District 36
Incumbent Democrat Robert Cornegy was unopposed in the Democratic primary.

General election

District 37
Incumbent Democrat Rafael Espinal was unopposed in the Democratic primary.

General election

District 38
Democratic primary

General election

District 39
Incumbent Democrat Brad Lander was unopposed in the Democratic primary.

General election

District 40
Democratic primary

General election

District 41
Incumbent Democrat Darlene Mealy was term-limited and could not seek a 4th term.
Democratic primary

General election

District 42
Democratic primary

General election

District 43
Incumbent Democrat Vincent Gentile was term-limited and could not seek a 4th term.
Democratic primary

Republican primary

General election

District 44
Incumbent Democrat David G. Greenfield declined to seek another term.

General election

District 45
Democratic primary

General election

District 46
Incumbent Democrat Alan Maisel was unopposed in the Democratic primary.

General election

District 47
Incumbent Democrat Mark Treyger was unopposed in the Democratic primary.

General election

District 48
Democratic primary

General election

Staten Island

District 49
Democratic primary

General election

District 50
Incumbent Republican Steven Matteo was unopposed in the Republican primary.

General election

District 51
Incumbent Republican Joseph Borelli was unopposed in the Republican primary.

General election

Notes

References 

New York City Council
2017
New York City Council
Election City Council